Vol. II: 1990 – A New Decade is a 1990 album by Soul II Soul. The album reached No. 1 in the UK in May 1990, and contained three UK hits, "Get a Life", which reached No. 3 (and which peaked at No. 54 on America's Billboard Hot 100), "A Dream's a Dream", which made No. 6 (and peaked at No. 85 on the Hot 100), and "Missing You", which reached No. 22 (and did not chart on the Hot 100).

The album was recorded following the departure of Caron Wheeler (the Soul II Soul collective's best known singer). Guest performers included singers Kym Mazelle, Lamya, Marcia Lewis, and Victoria Wilson-James, saxophonist Courtney Pine and New York hip-hop scenester Fab 5 Freddy.

Track listing

Personnel 

Jazzie B - musical director, co-producer, mixing, vocals on "Get a Life" & "Our Time Has Now Come"
Nellee Hooper - co-producer, mixing
Tony "Dobie" Campbell - assistant producer 
Howard Bernstein - engineer
Marcia Lewis - vocals on "Get a Life", "People"
Philip "Daddae" Harvey - vocals on "Get a Life"; guitars/percussion/keyboards (uncredited)
Lamya Hafidh Sultan Al-Mugheiry - vocals on "Love Come Through" & "In the Heat of the Night"
Kym Mazelle - vocals on "Missing You"
Courtney Pine - saxophone on "Courtney Blows"
Pinise Sula - vocals on "1990. A New Decade" & "Our Time Has Now Come"
Sonti Mndebele - vocals on "1990. A New Decade" & "Our Time Has Now Come" 
Nomsa Caluza - vocals on "1990. A New Decade" & "Our Time Has Now Come"
Bambi Fazakerley - vocals on "1990. A New Decade" & "Our Time Has Now Come"
Victoria Wilson-James - vocals on "A Dream's a Dream"
Fred "Fab 5 Freddy" Brathwaite - vocals on "Our Time Has Now Come"
Simon Law - keyboards (uncredited)
Michael McEvoy - piano 'People', 'A Dreams A Dream'  and 'Time', keyboards 'Love Come Through', 'Missing You'

Charts

Weekly charts

Year-end charts

Certifications

See also
 List of number-one albums from the 1990s (UK)

References

External links

1990 albums
Soul II Soul albums
Albums produced by Nellee Hooper
Sequel albums
Virgin Records albums